Lauri Pihlap (born 9 March 1982 in Tallinn) is an Estonian pop and R&B singer and hip hop artist.

In 2000 he joined the band 2XL (later Soul Militia).

In 2007 he started its solo career under the name Lowry. His debut album's name is "Split Personality" (2007). In 2009 he was participated at Eesti Laul 2009, reaching to the final.

He returned to Eesti Laul 2022 with the song "Take Me Home", written by himself, but failed to qualify from the quarter final.

References

1982 births
Living people
21st-century Estonian male singers
Estonian pop singers
English-language singers from Estonia
Singers from Tallinn